A picnic game is a game played at an outdoor meal or picnic.

Types
Games played at a picnic may use the food which has been brought.  Heavy food such as a watermelon may be used in a relay race which also serves the purpose of transport the food to the eating area.  After it is consumed, the seed or stones of fruit like cherries  may be used for a spitting contest game or marbles.

History
In the mid 19th century, picnic games were organised by charities in the US to raise funds.  In the 1880s, companies started to sponsor such picnic events for publicity and to gain the favour of their employees. The black community was segregated at this time but to gain respectability, games such a baseball were organised by black politicians at picnics in municipal parks and fairgrounds.

Organisation
If a large crowd is expected for picnic because it is a community event then some organisation will be required.  A schedule of events will be drawn up and events will be organised for different levels of ability and types of participant: men, women, adults and children.  Handbills, notices and tickets may be used to publicise and administer the events.

References

Outdoor games
Game